The 2018 Mississippi College Choctaws football team represented Mississippi College during the 2018 NCAA Division II football season. They were led by fifth-year head coach John Bland. The Choctaws played their home games at Robinson-Hale Stadium and were members of the Gulf South Conference (GSC).

Preseason

Gulf South Conference coaches poll
On August 2, 2018, the Gulf South Conference released their preseason coaches poll with the Choctaws predicted to finish eighth place in the conference.

Preseason All-Gulf South Conference Team
The Choctaws had one player at one position selected to the preseason all-Gulf South Conference team.

Special teams
Chakel Gates – RS

Schedule
Mississippi College 2018 football schedule consists of six home and five away games in the regular season. The Choctaws will host GSC foes Valdosta State, West Alabama, West Florida, West Georgia , and will travel to Delta State, Florida Tech, North Greenville, and Shorter.

The Choctaws will host two of the three non-conference games against Clark Atlanta from the Southern Intercollegiate Athletic Conference and Southwest Baptist Bearcats football from the Great Lakes Valley Conference, and will travel to North Alabama, which is a FCS Independent team.

Two of the eleven games will be broadcast on ESPN3, as part of the Gulf South Conference Game of the Week.

Schedule Source:
The game between North Greenville and Mississippi College was cancelled in advance of the arrival of Hurricane Florence. The game will not be rescheduled.

Rankings

Game summaries

Clark Atlanta

Southwest Baptist

West Florida

Valdosta State

at Florida Tech

at North Alabama

at Shorter

West Georgia

West Alabama

at Delta State

References

Mississippi College
Mississippi College Choctaws football seasons
Mississippi College Choctaws football